Thái Hòa is a town of Nghệ An Province, in the North Central Coast region of Vietnam. It was established in November 2007 on the basis of Thái Hòa townlet (thị trấn Thái Hòa) and seven communes formerly belonging to Nghĩa Đàn District. At that time, it had 70,870 inhabitants on an area of 135 km². Thái Hòa is the economic, cultural and social centre of north west Nghệ An.

Geography 
Thái Hòa has a border with Nghĩa Đàn District in the west, north and south and with Quỳnh Lưu District in the east. It is around 80 km north west of Vinh (the capital of Nghệ An Province), 40 km west of the coast and 14.5 km south of Thanh Hóa Province.

Thái Hòa is a hilly district. Lowlands and valleys make up only around 30% of the area, while hills make up 60% and mountains 10%. However, the terrain is still flat enough to be advantageous for the widespread development of agriculture. Some of the soil is suitable for growing high value cash crops such as coffee, rubber, tea, and fruits.

10152ha out of 13518ha of the district's land are used for agriculture. 307ha are unused.

Con River flows through the town as well as two of the southern communes of the district.

Demography 
Thái Hòa has 67427 inhabitants, almost 500 per km2. 
5751 are members of ethnic minorities, mainly Thanh, Thái, Thổ. 
30750 are within working age and 35% of them involved in non-agricultural activities.

Administrative divisions 
The districts includes four urban wards (phường) and 6 rural communes (xã):
 Quang Phong Ward
 Hoà Hiếu Ward
 Quang Tiến Ward
 Long Sơn Ward
 Nghĩa Hoà Commune
 Tây Hiếu Commune
 Nghĩa Mỹ Commune
 Nghĩa Thuận Commune
 Đông Hiếu Commune
 Nghĩa Tiến Commune

Economy 
The structure of Thái Hòa's economy is as follows: 
 Agriculture, forestry, fishery: 17.3%
 Industry, construction, mining: 30.2%
 Services: 52.5%

Vinamilk invested more than 100 billion VND in the town in 2009. Since then, Thái Hòa is the site of the largest and most modern milk farm in Vietnam.

Infrastructure 
Thái Hoà is at the intersection of two national roads. 
National Road 48 connects it to National Route 1 in the east and the districts of Quế Phong, Quỳ Châu, and Quỳ Hợp in the west. There are no other national or provincial roads in these districts, which means that they are most conveniently accessed through Thái Hoà.
National Road 15 connects the district to Thanh Hóa Province in the north and various other districts and provinces to the south.

There is also a branch of the North–South Railway leading up to Thái Hoà. However, it does not seem to be used.

References 

Districts of Nghệ An province
Populated places in Nghệ An province
County-level towns in Vietnam